Chelsea boots are close-fitting, ankle-high boots with an elastic side panel. They often have a loop or tab of fabric on the back of the boot, enabling the boot to be pulled on. The boot dates back to the Victorian era, when it was worn by both men and women.

Chelsea boots and some of their variants were considered an iconic element of the 1960s in Britain, particularly the mod scene.

History

The design is credited to Queen Victoria's shoemaker Joseph Sparkes Hall. The shoemaker, Joseph Sparkes Hall, claimed that "She (Queen Victoria) walks in them daily and thus gives the strongest proof of the value she attaches to the invention". In his advertising of the period, he refers to the boot as J. Sparkes Hall's Patent Elastic Ankle Boots. The boot became popular for horse riding as well as walking.

Charles Goodyear's development of vulcanised rubber enabled the invention of the elastic gusset boot. The advantage of elasticised boots meant they could be easily removed and put on again. By the late 1840s, the fashion began to catch on. This became a prominent style in the West until the onset of World War I.

In the 1950s and 1960s, Chelsea boots became popular in the UK – and their association with the King's Road (a street in Chelsea and Fulham in inner western London) set of Swinging London – worn by everyone from the Rolling Stones to Jean Shrimpton – is believed to explain how the name Chelsea became attached to the boot.

Variations and similar styles

Beatle boots

Theatrical and ballet shoe maker Anello & Davide created a variant of the Chelsea boot in 1961 with Cuban heels and pointed toes for the Beatles, after John Lennon and Paul McCartney saw some Chelsea boots in its shop window and commissioned four pairs with higher, Cuban heels – this style became known as Beatle boots.

Beatle boots, as were Chelsea boots, were frequently adopted by mods and worn with tailored suits.

Work boots

Variants used as work boots include a type of riding boot called Jodhpur boots, originating from India, as well as other designs, including Australian work boots like those manufactured by Blundstone and other companies. Such work boots may have steel toes. In Brazil this kind of boot is known as a botina. Often rugged and utilitarian in design, and similar to Australian work boots, they are commonly associated with caipiras or the rural population in general.

See also
Side-gusset shoes
Beatle boots
Riding boot
Jodhpur boot

References

External links
Gentleman's Gazette article showing original Sparkes-Hall advert for boot

1850s fashion
1950s fashion
1960s fashion
19th-century fashion
Boots
Leather clothing